Pleasant Valley Grange Hall is a historic Grange Hall  located in the hamlet of Pleasant Valley, which is in the town of Sangerfield in Oneida County, New York. It was built about 1830 as a farmhouse.  It consists of a rectangular, -story, gable-roofed limestone main block with a 1-story service wing.  There is also a 1-story gable-roofed frame wing.  It has been used as a Grange Hall since 1922.

It was listed on the National Register of Historic Places in 1999.

References

Grange buildings on the National Register of Historic Places in New York (state)
Houses completed in 1830
Buildings and structures in Oneida County, New York
1830 establishments in New York (state)
National Register of Historic Places in Oneida County, New York